Lovre Kalinić (born 3 April 1990) is a Croatian professional footballer who plays as a goalkeeper for Hajduk Split and the Croatia national team.

Club career

Hajduk Split
Lovre Kalinić made his HNK Hajduk Split debut on 23 April 2011, under manager Ante Miše at the age of 21 years and 20 days, in a Prva HNL match against NK Slaven Belupo, which his side won 2–1.

After loans to Junak Sinj in 2009, Novalja in 2010 and Karlovac in 2012, Hajduk manager Igor Tudor brought Lovre Kalinić back to Hajduk Split to be the number one goalkeeper for the 2013–14 season.

In the 2015–16 season, Kalinić set a new record for most consecutive minutes without a goal conceded in the 1. HNL. The goalkeeper went eight games, or 775 minutes, without conceding a goal. The previous record was held by Zoran Slavica, who went 711 minutes without conceding a goal in the Prva HNL.

As a result of being part of Croatia's UEFA Euro 2016 squad, Kalinić missed the first three rounds of Hajduk's 2016–17 season, being granted an extended holiday by Hajduk boss Marijan Pušnik. He made his return on 28 July 2016, where Hajduk defeated FC Oleksandriya 3–0 in the Third Round of the 2016-17 UEFA Europa League qualifying at CSC Nika Stadium, keeping a clean sheet. In September 2016, Kalinić signed a new five-year contract with Hajduk. In his time at Hajduk, Kalinić made 134 official appearances across seven seasons. In total, Kalinić spent 17 years of junior and senior football with Hajduk.

Gent
On 27 December 2016, Hajduk announced that Lovre Kalinić had played his last game for the club, with a move to Belgian First Division A side K.A.A. Gent completed. The transfer fee is the highest fee for a goalkeeper in the history of the Prva HNL. The €3.1m transfer fee will make Kalinić the most expensive player in Gent's history. He was named Best Goalkeeper in the Belgian league for the 2016–17 season, after having played only half a season upon arriving in January to Gent from Hajduk Split.

Aston Villa
On 21 December 2018, English Championship club Aston Villa announced that they had reached an agreement with Gent to sign Kalinić at the start of the January transfer window. Villa had already attempted to sign Kalinić in 2016 but were denied a work permit. He signed a contract to the end of the 2022–23 season. He officially joined on 1 January 2019 and made his debut four days later in a 3–0 defeat in a home FA Cup tie against Swansea City. His league debut came a week later in another 3–0 defeat, this time against Wigan Athletic, which was followed by a 2–2 draw with Hull City – meaning that Kalinić had conceded 8 goals in his first 3 games. He played what would prove to be his last game for the club against West Bromwich Albion on 16 February 2019.

Toulouse (loan)
On 20 January 2020, Kalinić joined Ligue 1 club Toulouse until the end of the 2019-20 season. However, he made only four appearances before the league was called off due to the COVID-19 pandemic.

Hajduk Split (loan) 
On 22 December 2020, after making no appearances for Villa in the 2020–21 season up to that point, it was announced that Kalinić would go out on loan to Hajduk Split, where he started his career. The loan was scheduled to commence on 18 January 2021 – when the Croatian transfer window opened. On 22 January, he made his second debut for Hajduk in a 1–0 league victory over Šibenik.

On 11 July 2021, Aston Villa announced that Kalinić would rejoin Hajduk Split on loan for another season. Kalinić explained that Aston Villa had wanted to sell him to another club, but he was adamant that he wanted to return to Hajduk Split as he had been named club captain. Eventually, an agreement for a second season on loan was agreed by all parties.

Permanent return to Hajduk Split 
On 1 July 2022, Kalinić signed for Hajduk Split once again, this time on a permanent transfer. The details were not announced by either club, but it was rumoured to have been a free transfer.

International career
After Stipe Pletikosa retired from international football in 2014, Kalinić became Croatia's second choice goalkeeper behind Danijel Subašić. He made his debut for Croatia in a November 2014 friendly match against Argentina. He was part of Croatia's UEFA Euro 2016 squad.

In May 2018 he was named in Croatia's 23-man squad for the 2018 FIFA World Cup in Russia. He played the last match of group stage against Iceland making several crucial saves. Croatia finished as the runners-up of the tournament, losing to France in the final.

After the tournament ended, Subašić retired from international football. Kalinić has thus been appointed as the first choice goalkeeper for the national team. However, due to injuries and the consequent drop in form, he was benched again in favour of Dominik Livaković.

Career statistics

Club

International

Honours
Aston Villa
 EFL Championship play-offs: 2019

Hajduk Split
 Croatian Cup: 2021–22

Croatia
 FIFA World Cup runner-up: 2018

Individual
 Football Oscar Best Goalkeeper in Prva HNL: 2015, 2016
 Best AA Gent-Player of the Season: 2016-17
 Belgian Professional Goalkeeper of the Season: 2016–17
 Belgian Goalkeeper of the Year: 2017, 2018

Orders
 Order of Duke Branimir: 2018

References

External links

 

1990 births
Living people
Footballers from Split, Croatia
Association football goalkeepers
Croatian footballers
Croatia youth international footballers
Croatia under-21 international footballers
Croatia international footballers
UEFA Euro 2016 players
2018 FIFA World Cup players
UEFA Euro 2020 players
HNK Hajduk Split players
NK Junak Sinj players
NK Novalja players
NK Karlovac players
K.A.A. Gent players
Aston Villa F.C. players
Toulouse FC players
Croatian Football League players
Belgian Pro League players
English Football League players
Ligue 1 players
Croatian expatriate footballers
Expatriate footballers in Belgium
Croatian expatriate sportspeople in Belgium
Expatriate footballers in England
Croatian expatriate sportspeople in England
Expatriate footballers in France
Croatian expatriate sportspeople in France